In enzymology, a chitobiosyldiphosphodolichol beta-mannosyltransferase is an enzyme that catalyzes the chemical reaction

GDP-mannose + chitobiosyldiphosphodolichol  GDP + beta-1,4-D-mannosylchitobiosyldiphosphodolichol

Thus, the two substrates of this enzyme are GDP-mannose and chitobiosyldiphosphodolichol, whereas its two products are GDP and beta-1,4-D-mannosylchitobiosyldiphosphodolichol.

This enzyme belongs to the family of glycosyltransferases, specifically the hexosyltransferases.  The systematic name of this enzyme class is GDP-mannose:chitobiosyldiphosphodolichol beta-D-mannosyltransferase. Other names in common use include guanosine diphosphomannose-dolichol diphosphochitobiose, mannosyltransferase, and GDP-mannose-dolichol diphosphochitobiose mannosyltransferase.  This enzyme participates in n-glycan biosynthesis and glycan structures - biosynthesis 1.

References

 
 

EC 2.4.1
Enzymes of unknown structure